The brown cacholote (Pseudoseisura lophotes) is a species of bird in the family Furnariidae.
It is mainly found in northern Argentina, western Paraguay and Uruguay; also in southeastern Bolivia and Rio Grande do Sul.
Its natural habitats are subtropical or tropical dry forest, subtropical or tropical moist lowland forest, and heavily degraded former forest.

References

brown cacholote
Birds of Argentina
Birds of Paraguay
Birds of Uruguay
brown cacholote
Taxonomy articles created by Polbot
Taxa named by Ludwig Reichenbach